

Seasons

Key

Honours

References 

Football clubs in Wales
Sport in Wrexham County Borough
Football clubs in Wrexham